Double Cross Roads is a 1930 pre-Code American crime drama film directed by George E. Middleton and Alfred L. Werker and starring Robert Ames, Lila Lee and Edythe Chapman. It was produced and distributed by Fox Film, recorded on the Movietone sound system.

Synopsis
Ex-convict David Harvey attempts to go straight and settles in a small town where he meets and falls in love with Mary Carlyle. His former gang tries to persuade him to take part in a robbery of a wealthy woman but he refuses until discovering that Mary is in league with the gang.

Cast
 Robert Ames as David Harvey  
 Lila Lee as Mary Carlyle  
 Edythe Chapman as Mrs. Carlyle  
 Montagu Love as Gene Dyke  
 Ned Sparks as Happy Max  
 Thomas E. Jackson as Deuce Wilson  
 Charlotte Walker as Mrs. Tilton  
 George MacFarlane as Warden  
 William V. Mong as Caleb  
 Thomas Jefferson as Caretaker 
 Roscoe Ates as Ticket Agent  
 Yola d'Avril as Happy Max's Moll  
 Bill Elliott as Party Guest  
 J. Carrol Naish as Dyke's Lookout / Driver 
 Charles Sullivan as Barman  
 Harry Tenbrook as Wilson's Driver

References

Bibliography
 Goble, Alan. The Complete Index to Literary Sources in Film. Walter de Gruyter, 1999.

External links
 

1930 films
1930 drama films
1930s English-language films
1930 crime drama films
Films directed by Alfred L. Werker
Films directed by George E. Middleton
Fox Film films
American black-and-white films
1930s American films
American crime drama films
1930 crime films